Dopasia is a genus of lizards in the family Anguidae. The genus contains seven species, which are native to Asia. They are most closely related to the North American Ophisaurus, and are sometimes considered part of that genus.

Species
The following species are recognized as being valid. 
Dopasia buettikoferi  – Buettikofer's glass lizard
Dopasia gracilis  – Burmese glass lizard, Asian glass lizard, Indian glass snake
Dopasia hainanensis  – Hainan glass lizard 
Dopasia harti  – Hart's glass lizard
Dopasia ludovici  – Ludovic's glass lizard
Dopasia sokolovi  – Sokolov's glass lizard 
Dopasia wegneri  – Wegner's glass lizard

Nota bene: A binomial authority in parentheses indicates that the species was originally described in a genus other than Dopasia.

Fossil record
Fossils of the genus Dopasia are known from the Oligocene of Belgium and France, the Miocene of Morocco, and the Pliocene of the Balearic Islands.

References

Further reading
Gray JE (1853). "Descriptions of some undescribed species of Reptiles collected by Dr. Joseph Hooker in the Khassia Mountains, East Bengal, and Sikkim Himalaya". The Annals and Magazine of Natural History, Second Series 12: 386–392. (Dopasia, new genus, p. 389).

Dopasia
Lizard genera
Taxa named by John Edward Gray